Hat Yai is a Thai restaurant with two locations in Portland, Oregon.

Description 
Hat Yai is a Thai restaurant named after the city in Thailand of the same name. The original restaurant on Killingsworth Street in northeast Portland's Vernon neighborhood has a seating capacity of 36–38. Andi Prewitt of Willamette Week said of the restaurant on Killingsworth: 

A second restaurant is located in southeast Portland's Buckman neighborhood. The menu includes rice-battered fried chicken.

History 

Construction of the first restaurant was underway, as of December 2015. Hat Yai's menu was revealed in early 2016. Plans for a second restaurant in southeast Portland were confirmed in October 2017.

The business is owned by chef Earl Ninsom and Alan Akwai.

Reception 
In 2016, Alex Frane included Hat Yai in The Daily Meal's "ultimate guide to Portland's best Asian fried chicken". Matthew Korfhage named the restaurant Willamette Week's Pop-In of the Year. He also included Hat Yai in the newspaper's 2017 list of "16 Great Places to Eat in the Neighborhoods of Northeast Portland". In 2017, The Oregonian Michael Russell called Hat Yai the "Southern star in Portland's Thai food constellation".

See also

 List of Thai restaurants

References

External links

 

2016 establishments in Oregon
Buckman, Portland, Oregon
Restaurants established in 2016
Thai restaurants in Portland, Oregon
Vernon, Portland, Oregon